"Nuk E Di" is a song recorded by Kosovo Albanian singers and sisters Era Istrefi and Nora Istrefi. The song was written by Era Istrefi alongside producers Claydee, Lee Paul Williams and Teddy Economou.

Background and composition 

"Nuk E Di" was written by Era Istrefi alongside Claydee, Lee Paul Williams and Teddy Economou. Albanian producer Claydee was additionally hired for the song's production process. The song was composed in  time and is performed in the key of B minor in common time with a tempo of 90 beats per minute. The song is primarily sung in the Albanian language and marks the first time that both sisters have collaborated musically on a recording.

Music video and promotion 

The accompanying music video for "Nuk E Di" was premiered onto the YouTube channel of Era Istrefi's label, Ultra Music, one day before the release date on 18 April 2019. After the release, the song's music video was viewed over 1.5 million times in its first 24 hours. For further promotion, the sisters performed the song for the first time in the Coca-Cola Festival in Tirana and subsequently in the Colour Day Festival in Athens.

Charts

Release history

References 

2019 songs
2019 singles
Era Istrefi songs
Albanian-language songs
Songs written by Claydee
Ultra Records singles